Edward Lewis "Ed" Perry, Jr. (born September 1, 1974) is a former American football player who played in the National Football League.

Biography
He graduated from Highland Springs High School in Highland Springs, Virginia, where he earned four varsity letters in football and three in basketball. He continue to play football at James Madison University in Harrisonburg, Virginia. He was selected by the Miami Dolphins in the sixth round of the 1997 NFL Draft.  He played with the Dolphins through the 2004 season.  He played for the Kansas City Chiefs in 2005. In his early seasons he played tight end and served as the teams long snapper, but during his later years he played only long snapper and was regarded as one of the more reliable long snappers in the NFL. He was the last active player to have caught a touchdown pass from Hall-of-Famer Dan Marino.

References

1974 births
Living people
American football long snappers 
American football tight ends
James Madison Dukes football players
James Madison University alumni
Kansas City Chiefs players
Miami Dolphins players
Players of American football from Richmond, Virginia